The Sweeney is a 1970s British television police drama focusing on two members of the Flying Squad, a branch of the Metropolitan Police specialising in tackling armed robbery and violent crime in London. It stars John Thaw as Detective Inspector Jack Regan and Dennis Waterman as his partner, Detective Sergeant George Carter. It was produced by the Thames Television subsidiary Euston Films for broadcast on the ITV network in the UK between 2 January 1975 and 28 December 1978.

The programme's title comes from the real-world Cockney rhyming slang nickname "Sweeney Todd" used to refer to the Flying Squad by London's criminal fraternity in the mid 20th Century.

The popularity of the series in the UK led to two feature films,  Sweeney! (1977) and Sweeney 2 (1978), both starring Thaw and Waterman, and a later film, The Sweeney (2012), starring Ray Winstone as Regan and Ben Drew as Carter.

Background
The Sweeney was developed from a one-off TV drama entitled Regan which served as the pilot episode for the series. Regan is a 90-minute television film written by Ian Kennedy Martin for the Thames Television anthology series Armchair Cinema (see Armchair Theatre) in 1974.

The part of Jack Regan was specifically written for John Thaw, who was a friend of Ian Kennedy Martin, with whom he had worked on the TV drama series Redcap in the 1960s. Dennis Waterman was cast after his performance in the Special Branch episode "Stand and Deliver", also produced by Euston Films.

From the very beginning, the Regan film was seen as having series potential. After it scored highly in the ratings, work began on the development of the series proper. Ian Kennedy Martin saw the subsequent series as being mainly studio-based, with more dialogue and less action, but producer Ted Childs, inspired in part by Get Carter (1971) and The French Connection (1971), disagreed. Following this battle for creative control, Ian Kennedy Martin parted company with the project. His shoes as series writer were filled by his brother Troy Kennedy Martin, Roger Marshall, Ranald Graham and Trevor Preston.

Every writer on the series was given very specific guidelines to follow: "Each show will have an overall screen time (minus titles) of 48 minutes 40 seconds. Each film will open with a teaser of up to 3 minutes, which will be followed by the opening titles. The story will be played across three acts, each being no more than 19 minutes and no fewer than 8 minutes in length. Regan will appear in every episode, Carter in approximately 10 out of 13 episodes. In addition to these main characters, scripts should be based around three major speaking parts, with up to ten minor speaking parts."

Previously, most TV police dramas had shied away from showing officers as being fallible. The series shows a somewhat more realistic side of police life, depicting them as flawed human beings, some with a disregard for authority, rules and the "system". Police officers in The Sweeney are ready and willing to meet violence with violence when dealing with London's hardened criminals, and are prone to cut corners and bend the law in pursuit of their prey, as long as it gets the right result. Until The Sweeney, the violent reality of policing was largely ignored by British television. The series broke new ground for TV drama and didn't shy away from self-awareness and genre-referential humour. This is very evident in episodes such as 2.7 "Golden Fleece" when Regan brandishes a lollipop at Carter and says "who loves ya, baby" in a nod to hit US crime series Kojak (1973–78); or in 2.10 "Trojan Bus" when Regan whistles the theme-tune to the BBC's sedate police series Dixon of Dock Green (1955–76) after a particularly elementary piece of detective work.

The series also captured the zeitgeist as it was made during a dark period for the real-world Flying Squad. During the mid-1970s Flying Squad officers were publicly censured for being involved in bribery, corruption and for having excessively close links with the criminal fraternity. At the time, this reality served as a backdrop to the series, and it is reflected in the mood, tone and story lines of The Sweeney. Detective Chief Superintendent Kenneth Drury, the Flying Squad's real-life commander, was convicted on five counts of corruption and imprisoned for eight years. Twelve other officers were also convicted and many more resigned. In the late 1970s, this and other scandals led to a massive internal investigation into the activities of the Metropolitan and City of London Police lead by Dorset Police, codenamed Operation Countryman.  All of this may have inspired parts of the plot of Sweeney 2.

Cast and characters

Main characters
The two main protagonists are Detective Inspector Jack Regan (John Thaw) and Detective Sergeant George Carter (Dennis Waterman). The third is Detective Chief Inspector Frank Haskins (Garfield Morgan), their boss and a senior Flying Squad officer.

Jack Regan
John Thaw stars as Detective Inspector John "Jack" Albert Regan, a tough police officer, often frustrated by Scotland Yard's red tape. Originally from Manchester (like Thaw himself), he has been in London for several years. He occasionally refers to his northern roots (his poor upbringing, his father's work on the Manchester Ship Canal), which prompts banter from George Carter, a Londoner, such as humming "The Red Flag". A heavy drinker and smoker (comically, he is sometimes seen stealing other people's cigarettes), Regan has some success with women; although not as much as Carter, or in one episode, Detective Chief Inspector Haskins. He has an ex-wife, Kate, and daughter, Susie, who live in Ruislip.

Regan may be tough but he is also a decent man, seen to help out an ex-informer whose son is kidnapped in 4.9 "Feet of Clay"; and his sympathetic pushing enables his boss Haskins to ask for help when his wife goes missing after a breakdown, in 4.13 "Victims"; it's Regan who finds her. Regan will bend the rules in order to achieve the desired result: for example, fabricating evidence, arranging for a criminal to be kidnapped, illegally entering private property and threatening to lie about being attacked by a prisoner in order to get information. Despite this he has his own very strong moral code. He's unwilling to cheat for personal gain, delivers a blistering attack on a corrupt copper, and refuses to take bribes.

Although he is seen driving various cars himself throughout the series, Regan usually travels by squad car with police driver. He drives what is presumably his own car, a green 1974 Ford Capri (Mk II) 3.0 Ghia (PTW 475M), in episode 1.13 "Abduction".

George Carter
Dennis Waterman plays Detective Sergeant George Hamilton Carter who comes from south London. In the series' timeline, George was in the Flying Squad prior to events in Regan, but quit for family reasons (cf. Regan and 1.5 "Jigsaw"). Carter is not as aggressive as Regan and usually plays the "good cop" role. He is married to Alison Carter, a schoolteacher, but is widowed when she is murdered in episode 2.5 "Hit and Run".  He is a former amateur boxer, as shown in the pilot Regan, and is described as having professional boxing potential in episode 2.1 "Chalk and Cheese". Like Regan, he enjoys a drink, and follows football. After the death of his wife Carter is shown dating women in several episodes.

Frank Haskins
Garfield Morgan plays Detective Chief Inspector Frank Haskins. He is married and has three children, all at boarding school, and is Regan's immediate superior. Prior to the series timeline, the character had done "National Service in the Signals Corps in a minor intelligence role" (as revealed in episode 2.9 "Stay Lucky, Eh?"). He is frequently seen at odds with Regan, preferring more conventional "by-the-book" policing methods. (Though is still willing and able to "mix it" with villains on the street, giving Regan and Carter physical and/or armed support several times.)

The main episodes featuring Haskins are 2.7 "Golden Fleece", in which he is set up to be the victim of a corruption inquiry, and 4.13 "Victims", in which his wife, Doreen, suffers a mental breakdown.

During the first three series, Haskins appears in the opening titles of every episode whether or not the character appears in the actual story.

Haskins is absent at the start of the fourth and final series due to Garfield Morgan's other professional commitments, but he returns a few episodes in. Correspondingly, there are two versions of the fourth series opening titles, one with, and one without, Haskins.

Other recurring characters

The Squad
The series introduces several other Squad officers over the years including: Detective Sergeant Matt Mathews (John Flanagan); Detective Sergeant Kent (Carl Rigg); Detective Constable Thorpe (Martin Read); Detective Constable Jellineck (James Warrior); Detective Constable Gerry Burtonshaw (Nick Brimble); Detective Sergeant Tom Daniels (John Alkin).

Regan's squad car comes with an "authorised" police driver. In the first series Regan has a variety of drivers including Len (Jack McKenzie), Fred (Denis DeMarne) and Brian Cooney (Billy Murray). Episode 1.7 "The Placer" introduces the character of Bill (Tony Allen) who becomes Regan's regular driver, although he plays a peripheral, non-speaking role in most episodes. Tony Allen subsequently worked as wardrobe manager for many of John Thaw's later projects.

When Haskins is absent, other senior officers step in to manage the squad, including Detective Chief Inspector Stephen Quirk (Bill Maynard) and Detective Chief Inspector Anderson (Richard Wilson), sarcastically referred to as "Andy Pandy" by Regan, Carter, and other Squad officers.

Other more senior officers include: Detective Chief Superintendent Maynon (Morris Perry), a semi-regular throughout the series and more willing than Haskins to bend the rules to get a result (later promoted to Commander); Detective Superintendent Grant (T.P. McKenna); Detective Chief Superintendent Braithwaite (Benjamin Whitrow). Colin Douglas features as an unnamed Commander in series 1, with Michael Latimer as Commander Jackman in series 2.

The relationship between Squad officers is largely informal. Regan is always referred to as "Guv'nor", or just "Guv". He invariably calls Carter and the other Squad members by their first names, or occasionally nicknames. Carter, as Regan's assigned Sergeant, is frequently addressed as "Skipper" or "Skip". When off duty, Regan and Carter are friends and drinking buddies, so in private Carter calls him "Jack". This is all in accordance with widespread police convention. Everyone calls DCI Haskins simply "Haskins" (or Mister Haskins), though Regan occasionally calls him by his first name, "Frank".

The Cars 
The cars used in The Sweeney became just as important to the series as any of the human characters.

The most iconic car in the series is NHK 295M, a metallic copper-bronze 1974 Ford Consul 3000 GT V6 (often mistaken for a Granada Mk1). As well as being the main squad car used to get Regan and Carter around London, it also features in the opening titles of series 1-3 (driven by stuntman Joe Wadham).

Other squad cars featured include an onyx green 1973 Ford Granada 3.0 Ghia (Mk1) (NHK 292M), a blue 1974 Ford Cortina 2000 XL (Mk3) (NHK 296M), a bronze 1976 Ford Granada (Mk1) 3.0 Ghia X (RHJ 997R). The main squad cars were supplied for filming by Ford from their press fleet at no cost, and the producers were specifically told that the cars were not to be damaged. Such was the prominence of the company's cars in the series, it was jokingly referred to as "The Ford Squad". In later episodes Ford updated the cars, providing a metallic silver Mk1 Ford Granada Ghia 3.0 V6 (NWC 301P), a silver 1978 Ford Granada (Mk2) 2.8iS (VHK 491S) and a silver Ford Cortina (Mk4) 2.0 GL (PNO 548R), among others.

A jupiter red Granada (UAY 272S) was due to be used for filming in season four but it suffered bodywork damage while being delivered to Euston Films and was replaced.

The series is infamous for featuring Jaguars as the criminal's car of choice. Jaguar S-types in particular were regularly deployed throughout the series as getaway cars, most notably in episode 1.10 "Stoppo Driver". A blue/grey S-type DWD 606C is used in the series 1-3 opening titles, pursued and chased down by the Squad in NHK 295M.

One reason cited for the regular appearance of Jaguars is that they were favoured by the stunt drivers as being the "safest" cars to use. The same few cars would be used and re-used, crashed, fixed up, and resprayed numerous times. According to Kevin Whately, John Thaw claimed that he had witnessed the regency red 1960 Jaguar Mark 2 (registration 248 RPA) used in Inspector Morse being written off several times while filming The Sweeney. Apparently, the car was in real-life a "polished up wreck" and would often break down during filming.

A red Fiat 850 coupé (UJB 92G) makes cameo appearances in several episodes: typically, it is parked at the side of the road as the action takes place around it. One theory is that the car belonged to a crew member who tried to include it as an in-joke in as many episodes as possible.

Family
Other featured characters include the close family of the three leads.

Regan's ex-wife Kate (Janet Key) appears in the pilot Regan and in episode 1.13 "Abduction". Their daughter Susie (Jennifer Thanisch) appears most notably in "Abduction".

Carter's wife Alison (Stephanie Turner) is seen attempting to prise him away from the Squad in episode 1.5 "Jigsaw", while her hostility toward Regan is apparent in 1.13 "Abduction". She is murdered in episode 2.5 "Hit and Run". In the DVD commentary for "Abduction", it is claimed that Alison was written out because actress Stephanie Turner was asking for too much money to continue to appear in the series. Stephanie Turner went on to appear in Juliet Bravo, also devised and part-written by Ian Kennedy Martin.

Doreen Haskins (Sheila Reid) features in the penultimate episode 4.12 "Victims", which deals with her deteriorating mental health and the impact of police work on family life. One of Haskins' three children, Richard, also appears in this episode.

Guest stars

Guest stars in the show included:

Joss Ackland
Tony Anholt
Coral Atkins
Lynda Bellingham
Hywel Bennett
Brian Blessed
James Booth
Donald Burton
Simon Callow
Cheryl Campbell
Tony Caunter
Warren Clarke
George Cole ɫ
Kenneth Colley
James Cosmo
John Rhys-Davies
Vernon Dobtcheff
Diana Dors
Colin Douglas
Lesley-Anne Down
Rosemarie Dunham
Michael Elphick
Arthur English
Norman Eshley

Derek Francis
Ronald Fraser
Prunella Gee
Sheila Gish
Peter Glaze
Julian Glover
Brian Hall
Cheryl Hall
Edward Hardwicke
Tina Heath
Ian Hendry
Del Henney
Paul Henry
Julian Holloway
John Hurt
Ken Hutchison
Barrie Ingham
David Jackson
Geraldine James
Peter Jeffrey
Paul Jones
John Junkin
Roy Kinnear

Ronald Lacey
Alan Lake
Lynda La Plante
George Layton
Maureen Lipman
Sue Lloyd
David Lodge
Kenny Lynch
John Lyons
T. P. McKenna
Philip Madoc
Alfred Marks
Judy Matheson
Bill Maynard
Malcolm McFee
Warren Mitchell
Morecambe and Wise ɫ̩ɫ̩
Lee Montague
Patrick Mower
Billy Murray
Alex Norton
Jim Norton
Daphne Oxenford

Nicola Pagett
Geoffrey Palmer
Moira Redmond
Michael Ripper
Maurice Roëves
Sheila Ruskin
Tony Selby
Nadim Sawalha
George Sewell
Catherine Schell
Anne Stallybrass
Tony Steedman
Gwen Taylor
Stephanie Turner
Patrick Troughton
Peter Vaughan
Colin Welland
Diana Weston
Geoffrey Whitehead
Margaret Whiting
Richard Wilson
Stuart Wilson
John Woodnutt
Robert Gillespie(thin ice)
Tony Aitken(thin ice)
June Brown(Ep1)

ɫGeorge Cole and Dennis Waterman went on to star in Minder.
ɫ̩ɫ̩Morecambe and Wise appeared in return for Thaw and Waterman appearing on their show.

Many up-and-coming actors also appeared in the show during its run, such as:

June Brown
John Challis
Carol Drinkwater
Christopher Ellison

Janet Ellis
Richard Griffiths
Karl Howman
Sally Knyvette

Patrick Malahide
Andrew Paul
Sandy Ratcliff
Ray Winstone

Production 
The Sweeney strived for authenticity and social realism. This ethos was reflected in most aspects of production, from the storylines, casting, locations and most importantly the dialogue. As well as the series title, cockney rhyming-slang gave extra colour to the dialogue, including ‘poppy’ (money), ‘bottle’ (courage) and ‘grass’ (informer). Criminal and police slang was also used, including 'ringer' (a car thief, also a stolen car with fake plates), 'stoppo' (a getaway car), 'snout' (informant), 'factory' (police station/office), 'fence' (selling stolen goods, also someone who sells stolen goods) and 'fireman' (someone who deals with problems). Many of these slang terms were brought to a wider audience for the first time in The Sweeney, some even entered popular use, but the terms have remained part of the British crime drama landscape.

The Sweeney was shot on 16mm film, allowing producers to use much smaller and more agile camera crews than shooting on videotape allowed at that time. This made it possible to shoot almost entirely on location for both exteriors and interiors, helping to give the series a startling degree of realism and elevating London as a character of its own. Using film also allowed directors to feature many more action sequences. Directors Tom Clegg, Terry Green, Douglas Camfield, David Wickes, Mike Vardy and William Brayne were among the group of "guerrilla filmmakers" that realised the episodes. What they and the crews delivered is a fast-paced series, depicting the Squad's relentless battle against armed robbery; but it also includes a substantial degree of humour. For the period it has a high degree of on-screen violence, and it is not unknown for several deaths to occur in an episode.

Each episode had a budget of £266,000 with an eight-and-a-half-week production schedule: two weeks' pre-production (for casting, finding locations etc.), two weeks' shooting, four weeks' picture editing (the first two weeks of which overlapped with the shoot), two weeks' sound editing, and two-and-a-half days' dubbing.

The filming of each episode normally took 10 working days, shooting about five minutes of edited screen time per day. Due to this, the number of different filming locations had to be restricted to 10, i.e. one location per day. At the Euston Films production office in Colet Court, Hammersmith, a standing set of the Flying Squad offices was constructed which provided an alternative option for when inclement weather restricted the day's shooting. Two days would normally be spent filming on the set, equalling 10 minutes of any episode being set in the offices. Shooting took place through the spring, summer, autumn and winter months; exterior night shooting was expensive, and was limited to three minutes of external night material in any episode.

Filming location
Most of the locations used for filming The Sweeney were around the west London area—in particular, Acton, Chiswick, Shepherd's Bush, Hammersmith, Fulham, Earl's Court, Kensington & Chelsea and Notting Hill districts, close to the Euston Films HQ at Colet Court in Hammersmith. The London Docklands, derelict at the time, were ideal for filming location sequences. The opening titles were filmed in Colet Gardens. However, other notable locations in London, the South East of England and further afield were also used for filming the show's episodes and included:

Chertsey/Penton Hook Lock, Surrey - "Thin Ice", "Bad Apple", "On the Run", "Feet of Clay" & "Jack or Knave?".
Battersea - "Jigsaw", "Stoppo Driver", "Faces", "Trap", "Trojan Bus", "Country Boy", "Visiting Fireman", "Tomorrow Man", "May" & "Victims", "Chalk & Cheese" (Craven Arms, Lavender Hill)
Bermondsey - "Regan".
Black Park Country Park, Wexham, Buckinghamshire - "Regan", "Payoff", "On the Run" & "Hearts & Minds".
Dulwich - "Regan", "Ringer".
Dulwich Hamlet F.C. "Ringer".
Gozo/Maltese Archipelago - "Sweeney 2".
Earl's Court - "Bait" (Cromwell Crescent & Logan Place).
Earlsfield - Garratt Lane and Garratt Snooker Club - "Supersnout".
Hammersmith - "Jackpot".
Heathrow - "Golden Boy", "Stoppo Driver" & "Tomorrow Man".
Kingston upon Thames - "Hit and Run" & "Trojan Bus".
Ladbroke Grove - "Hard Men"
Maida Vale - "Night Out".  (The Warrington Hotel)
Peckham - "Ringer".
Potters Bar "Big Spender".
Putney/Putney Bridge "Contact Breaker", "Abduction" "Taste of Fear" & "Sweeney 2".
Queens Park Rangers F.C., Loftus Road - "I Want the Man!".
Raynes Park - "Big Spender", "Golden Fleece" & "Victims".
Richmond (River Lane; Leonard Gold's house) -"The Bigger They Are"
Roehampton - "Queen's Pawn", "Golden Fleece" (Bank of England Sports Centre), "Victims" & "Sweeney 2" (Danebury Avenue/Alton Estate).
Sandown Park Racecourse, Esher, Surrey - "Big Spender".
Shepherd's Bush - "Jackpot".
Southall Gas Works - "Faces".
Southwark - "Ringer".
Staines, - "The Placer".
Tooting Bec - "Abduction" (Trinity Road & Tooting Bec Tube Station).
Twickenham - "The Placer", "Golden Fleece" (Twickenham Stadium) & "Bad Apple".
Uxbridge - "Thou Shalt Not Kill" (Brunel University) & "Bad Apple".
Wandsworth - "Queens Pawn", "Jigsaw", "Abduction", "Country Boy", "Tomorrow Man", "May", "Drag Act" & "Sweeney 2".
White City - "May" (White City Stadium).
Wimbledon - "Contact Breaker" (Wimbledon Stadium), "Stay Lucky, Eh?" "May", "Lady Luck" & "Money, Money, Money".
Wokingham, Berkshire - "Thin Ice".

Series overview

Episodes

Series 1 (1975)

Series 2 (1975)

Series 3 (1976)

Series 4 (1978)

Films
The cinematic versions of The Sweeney feature the same actors and characters as the TV series, however both films have levels of swearing, violence, sex and nudity that would not have been possible on television at the time.

Sweeney! (1977) 
In Sweeney!, Regan and Carter become involved in a plot which shares similarities to the 1963 Profumo affair and British actor Barry Foster features as an American socialite loosely based on Stephen Ward. Made in 1976, and released in 1977, the film appears to be set in 1979. On screen and in-film references include the line "The same damned speech you made in 1978" and a large banner at the OPEC delegates meeting features the convention's logo and the year "1979". This suggests that the events of the film occur after the end of the television series chronologically, assuming series 4 is set in 1978 as broadcast.

Sweeney 2 (1978) 
In Sweeney 2, Regan and Carter are on the trail of particularly violent armed criminals. The gang has carried out several successful bank and payroll robberies all over London and killed anyone that gets in their way, even their own members. Regan and Carter are assigned the case as a last order from Detective Chief Superintendent Jupp (Denholm Elliott) before he resigns to face allegations of corruption in the courts.

2012 Reboot 
In director Nick Love's film, the characters from the original series are re-imagined, and the setting and action are moved to the early 21st Century. The Sweeney (2012) stars Ray Winstone as Regan, Ben Drew as Carter and Damian Lewis as Haskins.

In the UK, The Guardian's Steve Rose gave Nick Love's film a one star review, saying that "rather than upgrading the 1970s TV favourite, it (the 2012 film) treats it like a stolen car – to be stripped down, resprayed and erased of identifying features. Only the brand name has been retained."

The 2012 film was remade in France as The Squad (2015), also known as The Sweeney: Paris.

Music
The title theme music and end credit reprise were both written by Harry South, a key figure in British jazz during the 1950s and 1960s.

Dave Gelly writing in The Guardian called South's title music "the most emblematic TV theme of its day".

Incidental and background music for the series was selected from off-the-shelf production music libraries, including De Wolfe, KPM, Bruton and Chappell. In 2001 a soundtrack album Shut it! The Music of The Sweeney was released and in contains a large selection of the incidental music used in the programme, some augmented with classic pieces of dialogue from various episodes. Also included on the album is the main title theme music from the first feature film, Sweeney!.

Books
Nine books were written and released in 1977 published by Futura Publications Ltd.
The Sweeney
Regan and the Manhattan File
Regan and the Deal of the Century
Regan and the Lebanese Shipment
Regan and the Human Pipeline
Regan and the Bent Stripper
Regan and the Snout Who Cried Wolf
Regan and the Venetian Virgin
Regan and the High Rollers

The first three books were written by Ian Kennedy Martin, the rest by Joe Balham. The plots of the books are not taken from any of the television episodes; overall, the tone of the books differs somewhat from the television series in that Regan is usually depicted as working alone, and his relationship with Carter is distinctly unfriendly.

Popular culture

In 1977, the BBC responded to the success of The Sweeney on ITV and commissioned its own hard-hitting police series, Target. It was heavily criticised for the levels of violence and the BBC cancelled it after just two series.
The repeat of the episode "Selected Target" on 21 December 1978 recorded the highest viewing figure of the series, with 19.05 million people watching. This coincided with a 24-hour strike at the BBC.
The Sweeney is mentioned in the song "Wow!" by Kate Bush.; and "Cool For Cats" by Squeeze.
In the orange-tinted photographs that are shown in the closing credits for Series 1–3, an enlarged set of fingerprints is displayed on a board behind Detective Chief Inspector Haskins.
Reference is made to The Sweeney in the Black Books episode "The Blackout".
Regan and Carter appear briefly as part of a stakeout operation in one of the novelizations of the TV series The Professionals.
Scotland Yard's real Flying Squad lost an important surveillance technique when The Sweeney exposed their use of the roadside tents erected by telephone engineers, who would place them over open manholes in the street to protect them from the weather. These tents are frequently shown in the series as hideaways for keeping a covert eye on suspects.
A two-part 1998 instalment of Diagnosis: Murder, "Obsession", features lead villains named Carter Sweeney and Regan Sweeney.
The creators of the show Life on Mars and its sequel, Ashes to Ashes, have often stated that The Sweeney was a big influence on both programmes.
To date, only one episode of The Sweeney has been shown on the BBC. It was shown on 31 May 1993 as part of the "Cops On The Box" segment of BBC Two's "Crime And Punishment" season. The episode broadcast was "Supersnout". It was introduced by Shaw Taylor, better known for his Police 5 series on ITV.
In the UK, repeats were shown on UK Gold and Channel 5 in the 1990s. In the 2020s, episodes are repeated most weekdays on ITV4.

Detectives on the edge of a nervous breakdown
The 1993 Comic Strip film Detectives on the Edge of a Nervous Breakdown features a character introduced as "Shouting George from The Weeny" (played by Jim Broadbent).

Comics
In 1977 and 1978, publishers Brown Watson (who specialised in annuals based on TV series) published two editions of The Sweeney Annual featuring a mix of comic strips (some with art by Brian Lewis) and illustrated text stories, interspersed with occasional features on the TV series, articles about policing, puzzles and (in the 1978 annual) an interview with John Thaw and Dennis Waterman.

In the early 1980s, the comic Jackpot featured a strip called "The Teeny Sweeney" which was originally drawn by J. Edward Oliver. A trio of schoolboys played at being plain-clothes policemen, with two of them looking like little versions of Regan and Carter. They even had "Flying Squad" written on the side of their cartie. Their attempts at being helpful, however, almost always ended in disaster.

TV Advert
A TV ad for the Nissan Almera car in the late 1990s had two characters similar to Carter and Regan racing through London to deal with a "bank job". A suspicious group of men have entered a bank dressed as painters. As "Carter" races the car through the streets, "Regan" keeps bellowing at him and others to "Shut it!"

At one stage, "Regan" shouts "Mark it!", which is slang for following a suspect, but in this case, means "market" as "Carter" drives erratically through a market place. "Carter" tells "Regan" to stop shouting, to which "Regan" barks the reply "I can't!".

When they burst into the bank, it turns out that the men are genuine painters and that "Regan", their guv (or boss), is there to tell them that they have the wrong sort of white paint(!) "Carter" says, "Think we'd better go back to the yard, guv, and get some more." "Shut up!"

One of the painters talks in a squeaky-like voice and is called "Squealer", which is slang for informant.

Home releases
The complete TV series of The Sweeney was released by Network on 14 DVDs in 2005. This release did not include the pilot film Regan or either of the two feature films.

Regan was released on DVD in November 2005.

Both films, Sweeney! and Sweeney 2, have also been released on DVD.

In 2007 Network released an 18-disc box-set containing Regan, all four television series and both feature films. The box-set also contains exclusive extras, listed below:

Regan:
Introduction by Ian Kennedy-Martin.
Commentary with Dennis Waterman, producer Ted Childs and director Tom Clegg.

Series One:
Interview with creator Ian Kennedy-Martin.
Commentaries with Dennis Waterman, Garfield Morgan, producer Ted Childs, writers Trevor Preston and Troy Kennedy-Martin, directors Tom Clegg and David Wickes and editor Chris Burt.

"Thick as Thieves" episode and "Special Branch" episode.
Episode introductions by guest stars Warren Mitchell, Wanda Ventham, Prunella Gee, John Forgeham, Billy Murray, Tony Selby and Dudley Sutton.

Restoring The Sweeney

Series Two:
Interview with stunt arranger Peter Brayham.
"Wild Boys" featurette.
The Sweeney annual PDF.
Interview with writer Roger Marshall.
"Golden Fleece" episode script PDF.

Episode introductions by guest stars Bill Maynard, Gwen Taylor, James Booth, Ken Hutchison and Lynda Bellingham.

Sweeney! film trailer with introduction by Lynda Bellingham.
Sweeney! film promotional gallery.

Series Three:
"Redcap" episode.
"Morecambe and Wise Christmas Show" 1976 sketch.
"Strange Report" episode.
Episode introductions by guest stars Geraldine James, Steven Pacey, George Sweeney, Nadim Sawalha, Tina Heath and John Lyons.
"ITV – This is Your Life" clip from 1976 Thames trailer.
"Evening News Film Awards" clip.
The Sweeney 1977 Annual PDF

Series Four:
"The Electric Theatre Show" interviews with John Thaw, Dennis Waterman and Ted Childs.
"This is Your Life – John Thaw" extract.
"This is Your Life – Dennis Waterman" extract.
Series 4 textless titles with dual sound.
Episode introductions by guest stars James Warrior, George Sewell, Jenny Runacre, Nick Stringer, Gary Morecambe and Peter Wight.
Sweeney film trailer with introduction by Ken Hutchison and James Warrior.
Sweeney 2 promotional gallery PDF.
Out-takes.
The Sweeney 1978 Annual PDF.
Stills gallery Extract from "Behind the Sunshine" PDF, recounting the making of "Hearts and Minds".

Sweeney! and Sweeney 2:
Commentary on Sweeney! with Ted Childs, Ranald Graham and David Wickes.
Commentary on Sweeney 2 with Ted Childs and Tom Clegg.
Textless material.
These extras are exclusive to the boxset.

All four series one are now available as Region 1 (North America) DVDs.

Blu-ray Release
In 2012, the first series was released on high-definition Blu-ray by Network. For this release the original 16 mm film negatives were scanned in HD and comprehensively restored by BBC Studios and Post Production.

The pilot episode Regan was also given a Blu-ray release by Network at roughly the same time.

In September 2018, Network confirmed via Twitter that Blu-ray releases of Series 2 to 4 had been abandoned due to "lack of demand".

References

Further reading
 Manuel Alvarado and John Stewart, Made for Television: Euston Films Limited. London: Methuen/BFI, 1985. .
 Robert Fairclough and Mike Kenwood, Sweeney! The Official Companion. London: Reynolds & Hearn Ltd., 2002. . (review).
 Dennis Waterman, Reminder. Hutchinson, 2000. .
 Martin Day and Keith Topping, Shut It! Virgin Books, 1999. .
 Mike Kenwood and George Williams, Fags, Blags, Slags & Jags: the Sweeney. The Unofficial Companion to the TV Series, 1998. No ISBN.
 Troy Kennedy Martin, "Four of a Kind", in: H.R.F. Keating, ed., Crime Writers. London: BBC, 1978. .
 Andrew Pixley, "The Sweeney: Compulsive Viewing", in: Prime Time Magazine, issue 13. London: WTVA ("Wider Television Access"), circa 1984. .

External links
 
 
 
 The Sweeney at Nostalgia Central
 The Sweeney ranked
 Ian Kennedy-Martin, The Sweeney: a preamble
David Wickes: The Sweeney

1975 British television series debuts
1978 British television series endings
1970s British crime television series
1970s British drama television series
1970s British police procedural television series
1970s British workplace drama television series
British detective television series
English-language television shows
ITV crime dramas
Robbery in television
Television shows produced by Thames Television
Television series by Euston Films
Television series by Fremantle (company)
Television shows adapted into films
Television shows adapted into novels
Television shows set in London